is a Japanese professional association football team based in Akita, capital of Akita Prefecture. The club currently plays in the J2 League, Japan's 2nd tier of professional football league. Due to the club's former ownership by TDK and thus formerly known as the TDK S.C. (JaWiki), most of the players were employees of TDK's Akita factory.

History
The club based in Nikaho, Akita, was founded in 1965. They were promoted to the Tohoku Regional League in 1982. They played in the Japan Soccer League Division 2 in 1985 and 1986. They were the only club in Tohoku region competing in the JSL.

In 2006, they won the Tohoku Regional League championship for the fifth straight year. They were automatically promoted to the Japan Football League after they won the National Regional League Playoffs.

The team has announced that it would separate from its parent company and join the J. League if the club's final yearly standing should ever allow promotion.

In May, 2009, TDK announced that the football club will become independent for the 2010 season and be based around Akita. Later in 2010 the club's name was changed to "Blaublitz Akita". Blau and Blitz mean blue and lightning in German respectively.

In 2014 they entered the J3 League after previously playing in the Japan Football League, the third tier of the Japanese association football league system until promotion to J2 in 2020.

The club moved to Akita City and entered the J3 League for the 2014 season. The club finished 8th in each of its first two years in the professional competition. In the 2017 season, their fourth, they won the title, however due to their lacking a license to play upper-tier football, they were not promoted, becoming the first professional third-tier champion not to be promoted. However, Akita acquired the J2 license on September 27, 2018, after which they won the title again in the 2020 season, returning to the second tier for the first time in 34 years.

See historical emblems

Stadium
Their home stadium is Soyu Stadium, also known as "Yabase" (capacity 20,125 and the J.League's oldest serving stadium). The club practices at the adjacent Akigin Stadium and Space Project Dream Field.

League and cup record

Key
 Pos. = Position in league; P = Games played; W = Games won; D = Games drawn; L = Games lost; F = Goals scored; A = Goals conceded; GD = Goals difference; Pts = Points gained
 Attendance/G = Average home league attendance 
 † 2020 season attendance reduced by COVID-19 worldwide pandemic 
Source: Source: J. League Data Site

Honours
J3 League (2):
Champions: 2017, 2020
Regional Promotion Series (1):
Champions: 2006
Promotion to Japan Soccer League: 1984
Tohoku Soccer League (11):
Champions: 1982, 1983, 1984, 1988, 1989, 2000, 2002, 2003, 2004, 2005 (shared with Grulla Morioka), 2006

Current squad
As of 8 January 2023.

Out on loan

Club Officials
For the 2023 season.

Managerial history

List of captains
{|class="wikitable"
! # !!Name !!Captaincy years
|-
|align="right"|-
|Akira Sasaki
|align="center"|JSL Era
|-
|align="right"|7
|Satoshi Sato
|align="center"|
|-
|align="right"|17
|Moriyasu Saito
|align="center"|
|-
|align="right"|4
|Masatoshi Ozawa
|align="center"|2007–2009
|-
|align="right"|18
|Satoshi Yokoyama
|align="center"|2010
|-
|align="right"|2
|Hiroyuki Kobayashi
|align="center"|2011
|-
|align="right"|10
|Masatoshi Matsuda
|align="center"|2012-2013
|-
|align="right"|10
|Shingo Kumabayashi
|align="center"|2014
|-
|align="right"|4
|Toshio Shimakawa
|align="center"|2015
|-
|align="right"|24
|Naoyuki Yamada
|align="center"|2016-2018
|-
|align="right"|3924
|Hiroki KotaniNaoyuki Yamada
|align="center"|2019
|-
|align="right"|24
|Naoyuki Yamada
|align="center"|2020
|-
|align="right"|9
|Ryota Nakamura
|align="center"|2021
|-
|align="right"|23
|Shuto Inaba
|align="center"|2022
|-
|align="right"|33
|Ryutaro Iio
|align="center"|2023–
|-

Kit evolution

Award winners 
The following players have won the awards while at TDK/Blaublitz:

JFL Top Scorer
 Masatoshi Matsuda (2011)
JFL Best XI
 Masatoshi Matsuda (2010)

Top scorers by seasons 

 
Football clubs in Japan
Japan Soccer League clubs
Association football clubs established in 1965
1965 establishments in Japan
Nikaho, Akita
Sport in Akita (city)
Sports teams in Akita Prefecture
TDK
Japan Football League clubs
J.League clubs